Geoff Parsons (born 14 August 1964 in Margate) is a retired Scottish high jumper, who won three Great Britain titles (AAA Championships) in the men's high jump event. His personal best jump was 2.31 metres, achieved at the Commonwealth Games in Victoria. He was trained by Ron Murray.

International competitions

References

1964 births
Living people
People from Margate
Scottish male high jumpers
Olympic athletes of Great Britain
Athletes (track and field) at the 1984 Summer Olympics
Athletes (track and field) at the 1988 Summer Olympics
Commonwealth Games silver medallists for Scotland
Commonwealth Games bronze medallists for Scotland
Commonwealth Games medallists in athletics
Athletes (track and field) at the 1982 Commonwealth Games
Athletes (track and field) at the 1986 Commonwealth Games
Athletes (track and field) at the 1990 Commonwealth Games
Athletes (track and field) at the 1994 Commonwealth Games
World Athletics Championships athletes for Great Britain
People educated at Chatham House Grammar School
Anglo-Scots
Competitors at the 1987 Summer Universiade
Competitors at the 1986 Goodwill Games
Medallists at the 1986 Commonwealth Games
Medallists at the 1990 Commonwealth Games
Medallists at the 1994 Commonwealth Games